Araminta is a feminine given name.

People with the given name
Araminta Ross, who later adopted the name Harriet Tubman
Araminta Estelle Durfee, the birth name of screen actress Minta Durfee

Use in fiction
Araminta Lee, character in Kevin Kwan's novel Crazy Rich Asians (2013) and film based on the novel. 
Araminta, character in William Congreve's comedy The Old Bachelor (1693)
Araminta, character in Sir John Vanbrugh's play The Confederacy (1705)
Matilda Angelina Araminta Phelps, the name given to Tom Sawyer's baby cousin in Mark Twain's Adventures of Huckleberry Finn (1884)
Araminta, mother of Velvet Brown, the title heroine of Enid Bagnold's novel National Velvet (1935)
Araminta Meliflua, a minor character in J. K. Rowling's Harry Potter series
Araminta Spook, title character and protagonist of Angie Sage's Araminta Spook series of children's books, first released in 2008
 Araminta, one of the main characters in the Void Trilogy from Peter F. Hamilton
 Araminta "Minta" Herrick (née Cardew), one of the main characters in Victoria Holt's The Shadow of the Lynx
 Araminta Station, a science fiction novel by Jack Vance; first book of the "Cadwal Chronicles"
 Araminta 'Minty' Cane, character from the TV series Moondial and the Helen Cresswell book it was based on
 Harriet Araminta Lee, main character from Helen Oyeyemi's novel, Gingerbread
 A similar name was used by poet Richard Lovelace for the title heroine of "Aramantha: A Pastorall" (1649).
 John Dryden apparently used a variant of the masculine Greek name Amyntas for a female character in "Go tell Amynta, gentle swain" (1680s).

 Araminta Thornton, a character in In a Summer Season by Elizabeth Taylor (1983).  (“I think my mother got it [Araminta] from a novel she was reading when she was expecting.”)